Brachydelphis is a genus of pontoporiid known from the Late Miocene Pisco Formation of Peru and the Bahía Inglesa Formation of Chile.

Taxonomy
Two species are recognized, B. jahuayensis and B. mazeasi. B. mazeasi has a shortened rostrum that gives Brachydelphis its name, B. jahuayensis differs from the type species in having a longer snout and higher tooth count.

Biology
Brachydelphis mazeasi was capable of suction-feeding judging from its short rostrum, but the longer rostrum of B. jahauyensis allowed it to capture small prey items.

See also 

 Evolution of cetaceans
 List of cetaceans
 List of extinct cetaceans

References 

River dolphins
Prehistoric cetacean genera
Miocene mammals of South America
Neogene Chile
Fossils of Chile
Neogene Peru
Fossils of Peru
Pisco Formation
Fossil taxa described in 1988